Obârșia is a commune in Olt County, Oltenia, Romania. It is composed of five villages: Câmpu Părului, Coteni, Obârșia, Obârșia Nouă and Tabonu.

References

Communes in Olt County
Localities in Oltenia